Temptation of Wife is a Philippine television drama revenge series broadcast by GMA Network. The series is based on a 2008 South Korean drama series of the same title. Directed by Dominic Zapata and Gina Alajar, it stars Marian Rivera in the title role, Dennis Trillo, Glaiza de Castro and Rafael Rosell. It premiered on October 29, 2012, on the network's Telebabad line up replacing Luna Blanca. The series concluded on April 5, 2013, with a total of 113 episodes. It was replaced by Love & Lies in its timeslot.

Cast and characters

Lead cast
 Marian Rivera as Angeline Santos-Salcedo / Chantal Gonzales / Angeline Santos-Armada  
 Dennis Trillo as Marcelito "Marcel" Salcedo
 Glaiza de Castro as Heidi Fernandez-Montreal
 Rafael Rosell as Nigel Armada

Supporting cast
 Rez Cortez as Abner Santos
 Rio Locsin as Minda Santos
 Antonio Aquitania as Leo Santos
 Raymond Bagatsing as Romeo Salcedo
 Cherie Gil as Stella Salcedo
 Bettina Carlos as Madel Salcedo
 Ayen Munji-Laurel as Yolanda Gonzales-Armada
 Michelle Madrigal as Chantal Gonzales Armada

Recurring cast
 JC Tiuseco as Bernard
 Bubbles Paraiso as Leslie
 Mel Martinez as Pat

Guest cast
 Sheena Halili as young Yolanda
 Jay Aquitania as young Romeo
 Mel Kimura as Josefina Fernandez
 Patricia Ysmael as Scarlet
 John Nite as an event host
 Robert Seña as Robert Montreal

Background
Temptation of Wife is a 2008 South Korean television drama series broadcast by Seoul Broadcasting System from November 3, 2008, to May 1, 2009. It was written by Soon-ok Kim and directed by Se-kang Oh. The series starred Seo Hee Jang, Jae Hwang Lee, Woo Min Byun and Seo Hyung Kim in the lead roles.

The series also had a huge success in the Philippines during its run. GMA Network aired the series (dubbed in Tagalog) in an early primetime slot from October 4, 2010,  and concluded on May 27, 2011.

Production and development
In 2011, GMA Network's senior vice president for entertainment, Wilma Galvante stated that they would be adapting the Korean series, Temptation of Wife. Pre-production started in earlier 2012. The head writer, Dode Cruz stated that he would develop "a bit serious, sexier and edgier version" than the original. The producer assigned Dominic Zapata to direct the series.

Originally planned for a December 2012 premiere, it was later moved to an earlier date. following the cancellation of the drama series, Haram.

Casting
The cast was announced on September 11, 2012, during the series' story conference, with the main cast being, Marian Rivera, Dennis Trillo, Alessandra De Rossi and Rafael Rosell. As for Rivera's preparation, she stated that "Whenever I have a new soap, I make sure to ask some tips about the role. Then I talk to my director how he wants me to approach my role. I'd like to have an idea of the character that I am going to portray and how I would give life to it onscreen". She added that she wants every role she does to be different from the previous one in terms of how she going to approach it. Trillo described his character as a "not-so-typical-leading-man" role.

De Rossi was hired to play Heidi Fernandez. However, the role was eventually given to Glaiza de Castro due to de Rossi's issues with the role.

The series served as Rosell's first major project for GMA Network. Zapata, required the cast to watch the original series before filming began to familiarize their characters.

Filming

The series' plug, teasers and opening title sequence were filmed on September 11, 2012, in a studio at GMA Network Center in Quezon City. Filming for the series began on October 9, 2012. Many of the series’ scenes were shot on location in Quezon City.

Reception

Ratings
According to AGB Nielsen Philippines' Mega Manila household television ratings, the pilot episode of Temptation of Wife earned a 23.5% rating. While the final episode scored a 27.9% rating. The series had its highest rating with a 41.3% rating.

Critical response
Vincent Anthon Garcia of gulfnews.com said that "Marian Rivera has proved why she is truly the Queen of Primetime TV. Her current series, Temptation of Wife, has zoomed to the top of the ratings". Mario Bautista of Journal praised the show's main villain, Glaiza de Castro, said that "One reason why Temptation of Wife clicks with viewers is the fact that de Castro is so effective as the villainous Heidi. We know she didn't want to play kontrabida (villainess) again after she did lead roles in Grazilda and Biritera. But Glaiza made the right decision in accepting the Heidi role as it's really so "mark" and she can show her versatility as an actress who can do both lead and villain roles."

Accolades

References

External links
 
 

2012 Philippine television series debuts
2013 Philippine television series endings
Filipino-language television shows
GMA Network drama series
Philippine romance television series
Philippine television series based on South Korean television series
Television series about revenge
Television shows set in Quezon City